Zimica is a village in the Municipality of Duplek in northeastern Slovenia. It lies on the southwestern edge of the Slovene Hills east of Maribor. The area is part of the traditional region of Styria. The municipality is now included in the Drava Statistical Region.

A small Baroque style chapel-shrine in the village centre was built in 1826.

References

External links
Zimica at Geopedia

Populated places in the Municipality of Duplek